Aaron G. Frenkel  (born September 9, 1957 in Israel) is an international entrepreneur, investor and philanthropist.

Career 
Since the 1980s, Frenkel has been the owner of the Loyd's Group, a company that engaged in investments, property and real estate. energy, high-tech and the aerospace industry.

Frenkel established the Loyd's Group as a representative of the main commercial civil aviation industry manufacturers (O.E.M.) in Central & Eastern Europe as The Boeing Company, Airbus SE, Gulfstream Aerospace, Agusta, Embraer and others. The company is estimated to have been involved in investments and transactions worth over 35 billion dollars during the last 25 years.

Aaron Frenkel is also a real estate magnate who owns numerous properties around the world. In 2020, Frankel acquired control in Gav-Yam real estate company, one of the largest and oldest in israely real estate sector. In December 2021, he sold his holdings in Gav-Yam to Property & Building Corp. Ltd. (PBC) at a value of NIS 3.1 billion, earning a profit of 1.25 billion.

Frenkel, with Mubadala Investment Company from Abu Dhabi, acquired 22% stake of the Tamar gas field in the Mediterranean Sea.

Frenkel invested in the banking sector, in June 2022, he become the largest private shareholder in Bank Leumi (2.1%).

Frenkel is the chairman of the Euro-Asian Jewish Congress (EAJC), the vice president of the World Jewish Congress (W.J.C) and the president of Limmud FSU.

Philanthropy 
Frenkel is a philanthropist in the areas of health care, welfare, clean  environment and education.

Health care
Frenkel serves as chairman of the International Board of Trustees of Yad Sarah, the largest health and volunteer organization in Israel.

In September 2017, Frenkel funded and donated The Frenkel Emergency Medical Center (FEMC), located at Yad Sarah Center in Jerusalem FEMC includes a medical imaging department, treatment rooms, laboratories and other facilities. This new emergency center handles hundreds of thousands of needy people.

Frenkel has also supported the Sheba Medical Center and Tel Aviv Sourasky Medical Center and the Ezra LeMarpeh health support organization.

Community
Limmud FSU was founded in 2006, and Frenkel serves as its President. Limmud FSU engages young Russian-Jewish adults and empowers them to take ownership of their identity and connect with their communities through pluralistic, egalitarian volunteer-driven conferences of Jewish learning, culture and tradition.

Frenkel, along with others, assisted in the rescue of athletes and asylum seekers from Afghanistan after it fell to Taliban rule.

Personal life
Frenkel is married to Maja Ruth Frenkel, they have 5 children.

Awards and recognition
 The French Légion d'honneur, awarded by Nicolas Sarkozy.
 Chairman of the Israeli Presidential Conference during the tenure of Shimon Peres as President of the State of Israel.
 Chevalier de L'ordre de Grimaldi Medal of Honour, presented by Albert II, Prince of Monaco.
 Vice-president of the world jewish congress 
 Board chairman of the euro-asian jewish congress
 Honorary Consul of the Republic of Croatia in Jerusalem.
 Fellow Member of the Tel Aviv Museum of Art.
Tel Aviv University Board of Governors Member.
Recipient of The Yakir Keren Hayesod Award.

References

External links 

 Record audience cheers on the Jewish Russian revival, timesofisrael
 Hebrew University unveils new statue of Albert Einstein on Jerusalem campus, The Jerusalem Post March 6, 2015
 Aaron Frenkel, Chairman of the Israeli Presidential Conference 2011

Living people
1957 births
People from Bnei Brak
Israeli businesspeople
Israeli investors
Israeli philanthropists
Israeli Jews